Phari or Pagri is a town in Yadong County in the Tibet Autonomous Region, China near the border with Bhutan. The border can be accessed through a secret road/trail connecting Tsento Gewog in Bhutan known as Tremo La.  the town had a population of 2,121.

History
Thomas Manning, the first Englishman to reach Lhasa, visited Pagri from 21September until 5November 1811 and had this to say about his room in the town: "Dirt, dirt, grease, smoke. Misery, but good mutton." The Pagri Fortress (Dzong) was located here and was important for the government as it stood between Tibet and Bhutan. Pagri was a staging area en route to Gyantse and ultimately Lhasa.

Thubten Ngodup, the current Nechung Oracle, was born in Phari in 1957.

Gallery

Climate 
Owing to its extreme altitude, Pagri has an alpine climate (Köppen ETH) that is too cold to permit the growth of trees, even though the altitude is still marginally too low for the formation of permafrost. Example Mount Fuji in Japan, Uelen in Russia and Longyearbyen in Svalbard Norway. The winter is severe in spite of the fact that no month has daytime maxima below , and also very dry and long, extending as late as May. Snowfall, however, is rare because of the dryness. Summers, during which the great majority of precipitation occurs, are cool even at their warmest and consistently damp, even though the Himalayas prevent falls from ever being heavy.

References

Populated places in Shigatse
Bhutan–China border crossings
Township-level divisions of Tibet
Yadong County